B99 may refer to:

Transportation
 Beechcraft Model 99, a civilian aircraft produced by Beechcraft
 Bundesstraße 99, a German federal highway
 Jaguar B99, a concept car designed and developed by the Italian design house Bertone
 Lola B99/50, a Formula Two race car designed by Lola Cars

Other
 GTSE1 (also B99), an enzyme that in humans is encoded by the GTSE1 gene
 Sicilian Defence, Najdorf Variation (ECO: B90–B99), one of the most respected and deeply studied of all chess openings